Bakhtiyar Batyrzhanuly Zaynutdinov (Baqtiiar Batyrjanūly Zainutdinov; born 2 April 1998) is a Kazakh professional footballer who plays for Russian Premier League club CSKA Moscow and the Kazakhstan national football team. He plays as an attacking midfielder, right winger, left winger, centre back or left back.

Career

Club
On 25 November 2017, FC Astana announced the signing of Zaynutdinov.

On 12 January 2019, Zaynutdinov signed for Rostov. On 8 December 2019, he scored twice in a 4–1 away victory over FC Spartak Moscow.

On 25 August 2020, he signed a five-year contract with CSKA Moscow.

Career statistics

Club

International

International goals
Scores and results list Kazakhstan's goal tally first.

References

External links
 

Living people
1998 births
Kazakhstani footballers
Association football forwards
Kazakhstan international footballers
Kazakhstan Premier League players
FC Taraz players
FC Astana players
FC Rostov players
PFC CSKA Moscow players
Russian Premier League players
People from Syr-Darya Oblast
Kazakhstani expatriate footballers
Expatriate footballers in Russia
People from Taraz
Kazakhstan under-21 international footballers